Bavara is a village located in the Central African Republic prefecture of Lim-Pendé. Artisanal gold mining is active in the area.

History 
As of late 2008 Bavara was under control of People's Army for the Restoration of Democracy (APRD).

On 17 September 2020 Return, Reclamation, Rehabilitation rebel group took control of Bavara. They withdrew day later, but returned on 19 September. On 2 October rebels began forcing inhabitants to leave their homes. On 13 October 2020 it was reported that gold deposit was discovered there which prompted more rebels to arrive. As of 7 March 2021 Bavara remains under rebel control.

References 

Populated places in Lim-Pendé